Topeng Sahabat is the debut studio album by Indonesian rock band J-Rocks, released on 2005 in Indonesia by Aquarius Musikindo.

Track listing

2005 albums
J-Rocks albums